Georg Heinrich Ferdinand Nesselmann  (February 14, 1811 in Fürstenau, near Tiegenhof, West Prussia (now Kmiecin, within Nowy Dwór Gdański) – January 7, 1881 in Königsberg) was a German orientalist, a philologist with interests in Baltic languages, and a mathematics historian.

At the University of Königsberg he studied mathematics under Carl Gustav Jacob Jacobi and Friedrich Julius Richelot, and oriental philology under Peter von Bohlen. In 1837 he received his PhD at Königsberg, where in 1859 he became a full professor of Arabic and Sanskrit.

In his book "Die Sprache der alten Preußen" (The language of the Old Prussians, 1845), he suggested the term "Baltic languages".

Works

 Versuch einer kritischen Geschichte der Algebra, G. Reimer, Berlin 1842
 Wörterbuch der littauischen Sprache, Gebrüder Bornträger, Königsberg 1851
 Littauische Volkslieder, gesammelt, kritisch bearbeitet und metrisch übersetzt, Dümmler, Berlin 1853
Thesaurus linguae prussicae, 1873, Reprint 1969
Die Sprache der alten Preußen an ihren Überresten erläutert, 1845 Berlin: Reimer
 Ein deutsch-preußisches Vocabularium aus dem Anfange des 15. Jahrhunderts. In: Altpreußische Monatsschrift Bd. 4, Heft 5, Königsberg 1868

References

1811 births
1881 deaths
People from Nowy Dwór Gdański County
People from West Prussia
Balticists
19th-century German mathematicians
German philologists
German orientalists
19th-century German writers
19th-century German male writers
University of Königsberg alumni
Academic staff of the University of Königsberg
German male non-fiction writers